The following radio stations broadcast on FM frequency 76.5 MHz:

Japan
JOAW-FM at Osaka
InterFM at Yokohama

References 

Lists of radio stations by frequency

Dreams FM at Kurume